Rhapsody is a 1915 piece for piano solo by the English composer John Ireland.

A performance takes about 8 minutes.

BBC Music Magazine (September 2010) called it "one of Ireland’s most important piano works". In the Gramophone Awards Issue 2010, Andrew Achenbach described it as a "magnificently stormy essay". According to Muso Magazine (August 2010), it "contains the sort of wacky virtuosity found in Debussy's L'isle joyeuse" (1904).

References 

Solo piano pieces by John Ireland
1915 compositions
Ireland, John